Ricardo Acioly and Dácio Campos were the defending champions, but competed this year with different partners. Acioly teamed up with Miguel Nido and lost in the quarterfinals to Danilo Marcelino and Mauro Menezes, while Campos teamed up with José Daher and lost in the first round to Pablo Albano and César Kist.

Javier Frana and Gustavo Luza won the title by defeating Luiz Mattar and Cássio Motta 7–6, 7–6 in the final.

Seeds

Draw

References

External links
 Official results archive (ATP)
 Official results archive (ITF)

Chevrolet
1990 Chevrolet Classic
Guarujá Open